Bajío International Airport, officially known as Aeropuerto Internacional de Guanajuato (Guanajuato International Airport) , is an international airport located in Silao, Guanajuato, Mexico. It handles national and international air traffic for the area that includes the city of León and the state capital, Guanajuato. Guanajuato International Airport is an important connecting point for some flights from Mexico City to the United States.

The general director announced plans to build a cargo terminal and to construct of a second runway. The facility replaced the San Carlos Airport which is now part of the urban center of León. In late 2015, work began on the construction of a parallel taxiway that would run the length of the runway. In August 2016, the airport opened its first and only VIP lounge, while in January 2017, work began on the modernization of the entire terminal, including expansion of the departures level as well as relocation of the customs and immigration checkpoint. Work was completed in mid-2018.

It is one of the ten busiest airports in Mexico; it handled 2,119,000 passengers in 2021 and 2,603,200 passengers in 2022, an increase of 22.9% from previous year.

Airlines and destinations

Destinations map

Statistics

Passengers

Top destinations

Notes

Services

Car rental
 Veico Car Rental
 City Car Rental

Accidents and incidents
On 17 September 2021, a VivaAerobús Airbus A320-200, registered XA-VAP, experienced an engine failure shortly after takeoff from El Bajío. The aircraft landed safely after circling the airport and burning fuel for 25 minutes.

See also

List of the busiest airports in Mexico

References

External links
Guanajuato International Airport

Airports in Guanajuato
Buildings and structures in León, Guanajuato
Guanajuato City
Tourist attractions in Guanajuato
Transportation in Guanajuato